Les "Rimouski Rocket" Anning (born -28 January 2008) was an ice hockey player who played mainly in Great Britain during the 1940s and 1950s. He was a member of the British Ice Hockey Hall of Fame.

Career
Anning was born in Rimouski, Quebec, Canada. He came to England when he was 19 years old and joined the Wembley Monarchs for the 1946–47 English National League season. The following season he split his time between the Monarchs in the UK and the Montreal Royals and Shawinigan-Falls Cataracts in the Quebec Senior Hockey League. Anning moved to the Wembley Lions for the 1948–49 season before moving to the Earls Court Rangers for three seasons. Whilst playing for the Rangers, Anning was voted to the All-star team twice and being one third of the high scoring "BAR line" with Kenny Booth and Cliff Ryan.

For the 1954–55 season, Anning moved to play with the Ayr Raiders in the newly formed British National League. However, he moved backed to the Wembley Lions the following season. He then went to the Brighton Tigers for the 1958–59 season before again returning to the Wembley Lions for the 1959–60 season. With the Lions in the late 1950s, Anning was again a member of a high scoring line with Kenny Booth and Les Strongman — known as the "BSA line" - the same post war acronym for the famous British military arms manufacturer "British Small Arms"

Anning spent the 1963–64 and 1964–65 seasons in Sweden playing for IK Viking.

Awards
Named to the ENL All-star B Team in 1947.
Named to the ENL All-star A Team in 1951 and 1952.
Inducted to the British Ice Hockey Hall of Fame in 1999.

References
European Hockey.Net
Ice Hockey Journalists UK
The Internet Hockey Database

External links

British Ice Hockey Hall of Fame entry

1927 births
2008 deaths
Ayr Raiders (1946 — 1956) players
Brighton Tigers players
British Ice Hockey Hall of Fame inductees
British National League (1954–1960) players
Canadian ice hockey right wingers
Earls Court Rangers players
Ice hockey people from Quebec
IK Viking players
People from Rimouski
Scottish National League (1932–1954) players
Wembley Lions players
Wembley Monarchs players
Canadian expatriate ice hockey players in England
Canadian expatriate ice hockey players in Scotland
Canadian expatriate ice hockey players in Sweden